Iilish Ross (born 21 June 1999) is an Australian rules footballer playing for the Richmond Football Club in the AFL Women's (AFLW).

AFL Women's career
Ross was drafted by Collingwood with their second selection and thirteenth overall in the 2017 AFL Women's draft. She made her debut in the eight point loss to Carlton at Ikon Park in the opening round of the 2018 season.

In April 2019 she signed an expansion period contract with Richmond. Ross suffered a foot injury in the 2020 pre-season which ruled her out from contention for the opening rounds of the season. She made her debut for Richmond against  at RSEA Park in round 6 of the 2020 season.

Statistics
''Statistics are correct to round 7, 2022'

|- style="background-color: #eaeaea"
! scope="row" style="text-align:center" | 2018
|style="text-align:center;"|
| 21 || 5 || 0 || 0 || 21 || 10 || 31 || 7 || 14 || 0.0 || 0.0 || 4.2 || 2.0 || 6.2 || 1.4 || 2.8
|- 
| scope="row" style="text-align:center" | 2019
|style="text-align:center;"|
| 21 || 6 || 0 || 0 || 23 || 7 || 30 || 7 || 15 || 0.0 || 0.0 || 3.8 || 1.2 || 5.0 || 1.2 || 2.5
|- style="background-color: #eaeaea"
! scope="row" style="text-align:center" | 2020
|style="text-align:center;"|
| 21 || 1 || 0 || 0 || 6 || 2 || 8 || 1 || 3 || 0.0 || 0.0 || 6.0 || 2.0 || 8.0 || 1.0 || 3.0
|- 
| scope="row" text-align:center | 2021
| 
| 21 || 9 || 0 || 0 || 29 || 29 || 58 || 3 || 13 || 0.0 || 0.0 || 3.2 || 3.2 || 6.4 || 0.3 || 1.4
|-
|- class="sortbottom"
! colspan=3| Career
! 21
! 0
! 0
! 79
! 48
! 127
! 18
! 45
! 0.0
! 0.0
! 3.8
! 2.3
! 6.0
! 0.9
! 2.1
|}

References

External links 

1999 births
Living people
Collingwood Football Club (AFLW) players
Richmond Football Club (AFLW) players
Australian rules footballers from Victoria (Australia)
Murray Bushrangers players (NAB League Girls)